Woking Crematorium is a crematorium in Woking, a large town in the west of Surrey, England. Established in 1878, it was the first custom-built crematorium in the United Kingdom and is closely linked to the history of cremation in the UK.

Location
The crematorium is in Woking, just outside St John's Village on Hermitage Road. Brookwood Cemetery, also known as the London Necropolis, is nearby but operated separately; it was established by the London Necropolis Company in 1849 to accommodate burials of London's deceased.

History

The crematorium in Woking was founded in 1878, when a piece of land close to St John's Village was bought by Sir Henry Thompson. He was a surgeon and Physician to the Queen Victoria. In 1874, he was a foremost founder and first president of the Cremation Society of Great Britain. The acre of land on which the crematorium was to be established was purchased with the aid of subscriptions (at £200 each) from the London Necropolis Company.
It was both secluded yet readily accessible, as a train-service, suitable for the conveyance of the dead, already ran between London Waterloo Station and Woking. The cremator was constructed by Professor Paolo Gorini of Lodi, Italy. It was not initially enclosed in a building but stood free in the crematorium grounds.

The new crematorium was first tested on 17 March 1879, when the body of a horse was cremated. The inhabitants of Woking showed strong antipathy to the crematorium and appealed to the Home Secretary, Sir Richard Cross, to prohibit the use of the building. Only after cremation had been declared legal in February 1884 during Dr. William Price's trial, could the Woking facility begin to operate.

On 26 March 1885, the first official cremation in the UK took place in Woking. The deceased was Mrs Jeannette C. Pickersgill, whom The Times described as "a well-known figure in literary and scientific circles". By the end of the year, the Cremation Society of Great Britain had overseen two more cremations, a total of 3 out of 597,357 deaths in the UK that year.

In 1886 ten bodies were cremated at Woking Crematorium. During 1888, in which 28 cremations took place, the Cremation Society planned to provide a chapel, waiting-rooms and other amenities there. The subscription list was headed by the Dukes of Bedford and Westminster. The Duke of Bedford later donated money to complete the buildings and to purchase ground adjacent to the property. The buildings were designed by an ecclesiastical architect in the character of English thirteenth-century Gothic. The churchlike appearance was intended to make the building look reassuring to the public at a time when cremation was an alien custom. The chapel was available for use in January 1891.

In 1892, 104 cremations were carried out at Woking. In 1902, the first crematorium was opened in London (Golders Green Crematorium). By 1911, the original one-acre site at Woking was extended to 10 acres and a Garden of Remembrance added.

Elected president of the Cremation Society in 1921, the 11th Duke of Bedford had the original cremator from Woking transferred to a new chapel at Golders Green Crematorium, where it was later used for his own cremation in 1940.

Cremations

Among those cremated here are:
 Helena Blavatsky, died 1891, founder of the Theosophical Society (ashes given to the Theosophical Society)
 Mathilde Blind, died 1896, writer (ashes placed in a monument in St Pancras Cemetery)
 Samuel Butler, died 1902, novelist (ashes buried, or scattered, at Woking Crematorium)
 Bernard Cribbins, died 2022, actor
 Edward Frederick Crippin, died 1892, businessman
 John Douglas, 9th Marquess of Queensberry, died 1900 (ashes buried at Kinmount, Dumfriesshire)
 Friedrich Engels, died 1895, philosopher (ashes scattered off Beachy Head, Sussex)
 John Galsworthy, died 1933, novelist and playwright (ashes scattered on South Downs)
 Hugh Grosvenor, 1st Duke of Westminster, died 1899 (ashes buried at St Mary's Church, Eccleston, Cheshire)
 Thomas Hardy, died 1928, writer (ashes buried at Westminster Abbey, heart at St Michael's Church, Stinsford, Dorset)
 Florence Hardy (née Dugdale), died  1937, writer, widow of Thomas Hardy (ashes buried at St Michael's Church, Stinsford, Dorset)
 William Ernest Henley, died 1903, poet (ashes buried at Cockayne Hatley, Bedfordshire)
 Ralph King-Milbanke, 2nd Earl of Lovelace, died 1906, author (ashes buried at Ockham, Surrey)
 Eleanor Marx, died  1898 (ashes buried next to her father's grave at Highgate Cemetery in London in 1956)
 Maud Naftel, died 1890, watercolour flower painter
 Rick Parfitt, died 2016, guitarist with Status Quo
 Francis Russell, 9th Duke of Bedford, died  1891 (ashes buried at St. Michael's Church, Chenies, Buckinghamshire)
 Elizabeth Russell, Duchess of Bedford, died 1897 (ashes buried at St. Michael's Church, Chenies, Buckinghamshire)
 Philip Snowden, 1st Viscount Snowden,  died 1937 (ashes scattered on Cowling Moor near Ickornshaw, Yorkshire)
 Julian Sturgis, died 1904 poet, lyricist and librettist (ashes buried at Compton Cemetery, Surrey)
 George Tomline, died 1889, politician (ashes sent to London)
 Alan Turing, died 1954, known as father of computer science (ashes scattered at Woking Crematorium)
 Beatrice Webb, died 1943, labour historian and social reformer (ashes buried at Westminster Abbey in 1947)

Thirteen holders of the Victoria Cross are recorded to have been cremated here.

There were 135 Commonwealth service personnel from both World Wars cremated here.  A memorial panel fixed onto the wall of the columbarium by the Commonwealth War Graves Commission lists the names. Numbers after some entries indicate niches in the columbarium, in other cases the ashes were scattered.

References

External links
 
 

Buildings and structures in Surrey
Crematoria in England
1878 establishments in England